Tunisia competed at the 1964 Summer Olympics in Tokyo, Japan.

Medalists

Silver
 Mohammed Gammoudi — Athletics, Men's 10.000 metres

Bronze
 Habib Galhia — Boxing, Men's Light Welterweight

Athletics

Men
Track & road events

Boxing

Men

Judo

Men

References
Official Olympic Reports
International Olympic Committee results database

1964 in Tunisian sport
Nations at the 1964 Summer Olympics
1964